Bavay is a French surname. Notable people by that name include:

 Arthur René Jean Baptiste Bavay (1840-1923), French pharmacist, herpetologist and malacologist. 
 Laurent Bavay (born 1972), Belgian Egyptologist.

See also
Bavay, a French commune.

French culture